Chowdhury Jafarullah Sharafat (born 10 May) is a Bangladeshi sports commentator.

Early life
Sharafat was born on May 10. He has two brothers and three sisters. His father's name is Sharafat Hossain Chowdhury.

Career
Sharafat started his career when he was in class Nine by auditioning to Bangladesh Television in 1980. He made his debut as a commentator during Romania vs Indonesia match at President Gold Cup Football Tournament. He was inspired by Australian cricketer and commentator Richie Benaud. He served as a Chief Judge at Commentator Hunt competition in 2017 & was known for his controversial judgements and corruption by favoring nepotism and promoting his known competitors by taking bribe from them a day before the event. 

Sharafat is the Independent Director of the Premier Bank Limited and also the member of the Audit Committee of Board of Directors of the Bank. He is one of the trustees of Canadian University of Bangladesh.

Personal life
Sharafat is married to Syeda Gulshan Ara and the couple has twins.

References

University of Dhaka alumni
Bangladeshi cricket commentators
Bangladeshi association football commentators
Year of birth missing (living people)
Living people
People from Gopalganj District, Bangladesh